Pass It On is the second play in a trilogy by New Zealand playwright Renée. The first play in the trilogy is Wednesday to Come, and the third is Jeannie Once. It takes place during the 1951 New Zealand waterfront dispute. Characters Cliff and Jeannie appeared as teenagers in Wednesday to Come.

Background 
The first performance was on 1 March 1986 by Theatre Corporate in Auckland, directed by Roger McGill. The play has been published by Playmarket.

Characters 

 Nell – thirty-four, Cliff's wife
 Cliff – thirty-two
 Jeannie – thirty
 Gus – thirty-four

Synopsis 
The play begins in February 1951, at the beginning of the 1951 New Zealand waterfront dispute. Cliff is a waterside worker, and on strike. Jeannie and Gus are involved with the union, publishing a Bulletin, putting the waterside workers' views across due to emergency regulations preventing publication of anything supporting of them in mainstream media. The play traces the change in relationship between Cliff's wife, Nell, and Jeannie. The play culminates with a march to advertise a public meeting to get public support for the strikers.

Productions

References 

1986 plays
New Zealand plays